John T. Wilcox II is a retired United States Air Force major general who serves as the Commander of the Air Force Installation and Mission Support Center. Previously, he was the Director of Operations and Communications of the Air Force Global Strike Command.

References

External links

Year of birth missing (living people)
Living people
Place of birth missing (living people)
United States Air Force generals